The 2018–19 West Bank Premier League is the 16th season of the West Bank Premier League, the top football league in the West Bank of Palestine. The season started on 30 August 2018.

Teams

Pre-season
A total of 12 teams compete in the league. Hilal Al-Quds are the defending champions. Shabab Al-Khadr and Duwwara were relegated from last season, and were replaced by promoted teams Markaz Shabab Al-Am'ari and Markaz Tulkarem.

Stadia and location

League table

See also
2018–19 Gaza Strip Premier League
2018–19 Palestine Cup

References

West Bank Premier League seasons
1
West Bank